Nahida Akter (born 2 March 2000) is a Bangladeshi cricketer. She is a right handed batter and a slow left-arm orthodox bowler. She made her debut in international matches against Pakistan in a T20 match on 30 September 2015.

In June 2018, she was part of Bangladesh's squad that won their first ever Women's Asia Cup title, winning the 2018 Women's Twenty20 Asia Cup tournament. Later the same month, she was named in Bangladesh's squad for the 2018 ICC Women's World Twenty20 Qualifier tournament.

In October 2018, she was named in Bangladesh's squad for the 2018 ICC Women's World Twenty20 tournament in the West Indies. In August 2019, she was named in Bangladesh's squad for the 2019 ICC Women's World Twenty20 Qualifier tournament in Scotland. She was the leading wicket-taker for Bangladesh in the tournament, with ten dismissals in five matches. In November 2019, she was named in Bangladesh's squad for the cricket tournament at the 2019 South Asian Games. The Bangladesh team beat Sri Lanka by two runs in the final to win the gold medal.

In January 2020, she was named in Bangladesh's squad for the 2020 ICC Women's T20 World Cup in Australia. In November 2021, she was named in Bangladesh's team for the 2021 Women's Cricket World Cup Qualifier tournament in Zimbabwe. Later the same month, in Bangladesh's third match against Zimbabwe, she took her first five-wicket haul in WODI cricket.

In January 2022, she was named in Bangladesh's team for the 2022 Commonwealth Games Cricket Qualifier tournament in Malaysia. In Bangladesh's second match of the tournament, against Kenya, she took her first five-wicket haul in WT20Is, with five wickets for twelve runs. Later the same month, she was named in Bangladesh's team for the 2022 Women's Cricket World Cup in New Zealand.

References

External links

 
 

Living people
2000 births
Bangladeshi women cricketers
Bangladesh women Twenty20 International cricketers
Bangladesh women One Day International cricketers
South Asian Games gold medalists for Bangladesh
South Asian Games medalists in cricket
Barisal Division women cricketers
Northern Zone women cricketers